XHCIA-FM is a radio station on 91.7 FM in Colima, Colima, Mexico, airing a pop format.

History

XHCIA received its concession on September 28, 1993; originally licensed to Coquimatlán, it was owned by Rosa María Quintero Barbosa. It was sold to its current concessionaire in 1997.

Match 
On December 26, 2019, Disney and ACIR announced they were mutually ending their relationship, which had covered twelve Mexican cities. Ten of the twelve Radio Disney stations, including XHCIA, were transitioned to ACIR's replacement pop format, Match.

Sale 
In 2021, concessionaire Colima Frecuencia Modulada, S.A. de C.V., which was 50 percent owned by ACIR and 50 percent by Gustavo Adolfo Petriccioli Morales, sold itself to  Manuel Armando Caraveo Urenda y José Encarnación Silvestre Rocha. The station dropped the ACIR-specific Match brand but remained in the pop format as "91.7, Tu Playlist".

References

Radio stations in Colima